{{DISPLAYTITLE:C22H29N3O}}
The molecular formula C22H29N3O (molar mass: 351.485 g/mol, exact mass: 351.2311 u) may refer to:

 Etodesnitazene
 PRO-LAD
 UV-328

Molecular formulas